Nikolai Fyodorovich Smolnikov (born 10 March 1949) is a former Soviet Azerbaijani footballer.

International career
Smolnikov made his debut for USSR on 3 March 1968 in a friendly against Mexico and played his only two other national team games in the following week in two more friendlies against Mexico. He was selected for the UEFA Euro 1968 squad, but did not play in any games at the tournament.

External links
Profile (in Russian)

1949 births
Living people
Azerbaijani footballers
Soviet footballers
Soviet Union international footballers
UEFA Euro 1968 players
Soviet Top League players
Expatriate footballers in Azerbaijan
Footballers from Baku
Association football forwards
Neftçi PFK players